The shrine of Khwaja Abu Nasr Parsa is located in Balkh, Afghanistan. It was built around 1598 and has an octagonal plan of two stories with axial iwans and corner rooms. Khwaja Abu Nasr Parsa was a spiritual leader of the Naqshbandi order and a theological lecturer in Herat. Although there is no epigraphical evidence identifying the shrine as the site of his tomb, art historians Golombek and Wilber have identified an unmarked tombstone in front of the portal as the Khwaja's grave marker.

Architecture 
All over the building written in Arabic language as same in every mosque in world. This building have two minarat (tower). One minarat in left side and one minarat in right sides. The interesting about the architecture is that it has 16 windows on the rim of this mosque. This windows give a good look to the mosque. The entrance of this mosque made up of wood. As other mosque this mosque has a dome that indicate the Qibla. Qibla is the place where people face and start to pray. Later the architecture of that time made pillar in order to support the weight of dome. And also the platform of the part of the mosque was added later. Not only the decoration of the mosque were changed but also a little part of the structure of the mosque was also reconstructed.

See also
 History of Persian domes

History 
This mosque was dated from 10th -16th centuries; it was later restored.  According to sources, it says that there were no such kind of evidence that show it is the shrine of Khwajah Abu Nasr Parsa. But people of the place believe that it was the shrine of Khwaja Abu Nasr Parsa. Khwaja Abu Nasr Parsa used to lead the prayer in this masque. According to McChesney, R. he addressed that his grave is lie down in this shrine. In that time he was in heart Afghanistan but, one of his family branch was lived in Bukhara which is located in Uzbekistan. In that time his family plays an important role in stability.

References

Bibliography 
  
 

Dargahs
Shrines in Afghanistan
Naqshbandi order